Kidd Lake State Natural Area is a protected area of Illinois on  in Monroe County, Illinois, United States, adjacent to the Fults Hill Prairie State Natural Area.

Kidd Lake State Natural Area is an example of the once expansive wetlands of the Mississippi floodplain known as the American Bottoms. The marsh was historically part of an  lake bed, and was once home to a variety of wetland birds, some now rare in Illinois. It is an important rest stop for migrating waterfowl and continues to provide critical habitat to a diverse range of birds, as well as amphibians and reptiles.

Notes

References

State Natural Areas of Illinois
Protected areas of Monroe County, Illinois
Protected areas established in 1970
State parks of Illinois
Wetlands of Illinois
Landforms of Monroe County, Illinois
1970 establishments in Illinois